Leo Villareal (born 1967) is an American artist. His work combines LED lights and encoded computer programming to create illuminated displays. He is living and working in New York City.

Early life and education 
Villareal was born in 1967 in Albuquerque, New Mexico and raised in El Paso on both sides of the border. He graduated from Portsmouth Abbey School in 1986. He received a BA degree in Sculpture from Yale University in 1990 and a graduate degree from New York University Tisch School of the Arts, in the Interactive Telecommunications Program (ITP).

Career
The decisive moment that started his career came in Nevada's Black Rock desert, during the 1997 Burning Man festival when Villareal rigged up a strobe-light array above his tent so that he could find it more easily.

On March 5, 2013, Villareal debuted his largest piece to that date, The Bay Lights," a public light installation consisting of 25,000 LEDs strung on the vertical cables of the San Francisco-Oakland Bay Bridge. The installation cost $8 million to install and was activated nightly through 2015. It was replaced in 2016 with a permanent version.

July 17, 2019, the first stage of his Illuminated River project went live, the project is running in three phases, and first bridges to be added were London Bridge, Southwark Bridge, Millennium Bridge, and Cannon Street Bridge. Phase Two, will add Blackfriars Road Bridge, Waterloo Bridge, Westminster Bridge, Lambeth Bridge, and the Golden Jubilee Footbridges, is planned for autumn 2020 and the entire project by 2022.

His piece 'Optical Machine I' was featured in The Miami Beach Edition during Art Basel Miami Beach. His piece 'Liminal Gradient for (RED)' was displayed at the (RED) auction co-founded by Bono. It was described by architect Sir David Adjaye as "an L.E.D. Rothko".

Installations 
Villareal is in the collections of the Museum of Modern Art (MoMA) in New York, the Renwick Gallery and the National Gallery of Art in Washington, D.C., the Brooklyn Museum of Art, and the Albright-Knox Art Gallery in Buffalo, New York, as well as in the private collections of contemporary art collectors CJ Follini. His work has also been on display at the Hirshhorn Museum and Sculpture Garden in Washington, D.C., Madison Square Park in New York City, the Los Angeles Museum of Contemporary Art, the PS 1 Contemporary Art Center in Long Island City, New York, The Northpark Mall in Dallas, and Brooklyn Academy of Music.

Art market 
Villareal has been represented by Pace Gallery since 2016.

Gallery

References

External links 
 Leo Villareal
 MTA's Arts For Transit — Hive at Bleecker Street/Lafayette Street

Living people
1967 births
Yale University alumni
Tisch School of the Arts alumni
Artists from El Paso, Texas
American installation artists
Portsmouth Abbey School alumni
Bridge light displays